Red Jew may refer to:
 Red Jews, a myth circulated in medieval Germany
 Crimson snapper, Lutjanus erythropterus, a fish
 Malabar blood snapper, Lutjanus malabaricus, a fish
 The Red Jew, a 1915 painting by Marc Chagall

See also
 Jewish Bolshevism
 Jewish socialism